Scabrotrophon chunfui is a species of sea snail, a marine gastropod mollusk in the family Muricidae, the murex snails or rock snails.

Description

Distribution
This marine species occurs off Taiwan.

References

 Liu, J.Y. [Ruiyu] (ed.). (2008). Checklist of marine biota of China seas. China Science Press. 1267 pp.

External links
 Houart, R.; Lan, T. C. (2001). Description of Scabrotrophon chunfui n. sp. (Gastropoda: Muricidae) from Northeast Taiwan and comments on Nipponotrophon Kuroda & Habe, 1971 and Scabrotrophon McLean, 1996. Novapex. 2 (2): 37-42
 Lai， K.-Y. （2008）. (A New Species of Muricidae from South China Sea)

Gastropods described in 2001
Scabrotrophon